News from Planet Mars (original title: Des nouvelles de la planète Mars) is a 2016 French-Belgian comedy film directed by Dominik Moll.

Plot
Philippe Mars is a pleasant forty-something whose meeting with Jerome, a psychotic college friend in search of love, profoundly changes his life. His life is already somewhat complicated, between his ex-wife that is entrusting him to the care of their children, a girl of 17 who swears by the work and success and a 13-year-old son who had his first Crush its first revolts. Add to this a crazy artist sister, a job in IT and so little fulfilling hallucinatory apparitions but benevolent of his deceased parents ...

Cast
 François Damiens as Philippe Mars
 Vincent Macaigne as Jérôme
 Veerle Baetens as Chloé
 Jeanne Guittet as Sarah Mars
 Tom Rivoire as Grégoire Mars
 Michel Aumont as The father
 Catherine Samie as The mother
 Philippe Laudenbach as The neighbor
 Olivia Côte as Fabienne / Xanaé
 Léa Drucker as Myriam
 Julien Sibre as Gordon

References

External links
 

2016 films
French comedy films
2010s French-language films
2016 comedy films
Films directed by Dominik Moll
Belgian comedy films
French-language Belgian films
2010s French films